Sarah O'Brien is an American poet.

Life
Her work has appeared in Eleven Eleven.

Awards
 2008 Cleveland State University Poetry Center first book finalist
 2008 National Poetry Series, selected by David Shapiro

Works

Translations

Anthologies
 "3,785 Page Pirated Poetry Anthology", Poetry Foundation

References

Year of birth missing (living people)
Living people
American women poets
21st-century American women